Saint Vincent and the Grenadines competed at the 2020 Summer Olympics in Tokyo. Originally scheduled to take place from 24 July to 9 August 2020, the Games have been postponed to 23 July to 8 August 2021, due to the COVID-19 pandemic. It was the nations ninth appearance at the Summer Olympics.

Competitors
The following is the list of number of competitors in the Games.

Athletics

Saint Vincent and the Grenadines received universality slots from IAAF to send one athletes to the Olympics.

Track & road events

Swimming

Saint Vincent and the Grenadines received a universality invitation from FINA to send two top-ranked swimmers (one per gender) in their respective individual events to the Olympics, based on the FINA Points System of June 28, 2021.

See also
Saint Vincent and the Grenadines at the 2019 Pan American Games

References

Olympics
2020
Nations at the 2020 Summer Olympics